The 2018 BWF Future Series was the twelfth season of the BWF Future Series.

Schedule 
Below is the schedule released by Badminton World Federation:

Results

Winners

Performance by nation

Players with multiple titles
In alphabetical order.

References 

BWF Future Series
BWF Future Series